Brian Patrick Regan (born October 23, 1962, in New York City, New York) is a former master sergeant in the United States Air Force who was convicted of offering to sell secret information to foreign governments.

Biography

He was born October 23, 1962, in New York City, New York. His childhood has been characterised as a difficult one; due to having dyslexia and having an "odd" personality, he was frequently bullied and ridiculed by classmates and children in his neighbourhood.

Espionage activity
From July 1995 to August 2000, Regan worked as a USAF assignee at the National Reconnaissance Office (NRO) in Chantilly, Virginia, and was a signals intelligence specialist. He was forced into retirement in August 2000, having failed to accept an overseas deployment. In October 2000, he was hired by TRW Inc., but brought back to NRO and monitored. In 1999, he had begun downloading data from Intelink, and in total removed 20,000 pages, CD-ROMs and videotapes from NRO. Regan's financial situation, a rift in his marriage, and a realisation that he would not be promoted eventually gave him the idea to commit espionage to make money. According to prosecutors, he had credit card debts of $117,000 and wrote a letter to Saddam Hussein offering to sell intelligence material for $13 million. He also made similar offers to Libya and China. He buried the majority of the stolen documents in several forests.

The plot was first discovered in December 2000, when an informant from the Libyan Consulate in New York handed the FBI a series of letters. The letters contained a letter written in a code Regan had created, as well as details on how to decode the letter, as well as code sheets. Each envelope also contained aerial images taken by US satellites of military sites in the Middle East, as well as other imagery to prove he wasn't bluffing. After narrowing the search down to Regan due in part to his dyslexia, FBI agent Steve Carr and other investigators began investigating him in April 2001. Upon his return to the NRO, cameras observed him using his work computer to again access Intelink files, with agents observing him taking notes. In August 2001, Regan was arrested by the FBI at Dulles International Airport, preparing to board a flight to Zürich, Switzerland. He was carrying classified documents and contact information for Iraqi, Libyan, and Chinese embassies in Switzerland hidden in his shoes. In February 2002, he pleaded not guilty to the charges.

Jury selection for the trial began in January 2003, with potential jurors required to fill in questionnaires asking their opinions on crime, espionage, the September 11 attacks, and the death penalty. Regan's lawyers had attempted to delay the trial due to the potential invasion of Iraq. Prosecutors sought the death penalty, the first time it would have been used for espionage since Julius and Ethel Rosenberg were executed by electric chair in 1953; the death penalty for espionage had been reinstated in 1994, but had not yet been sought on 10 prior occasions. The prosecution called upon FBI code expert Daniel Olson to testify as to the secret messages Regan had attempted to send to Iraq and Libya; Olson described the code as "sophisticated". Regan's attorney Jonathan Shapiro argued that the information Regan had used was "worthless" and described his actions as merely "bad judgment". Lawyer Nina Ginsberg argued that no serious foreign power would have dealt with him. The following month, Regan was found guilty on two counts of attempted espionage and one of gathering national defense information, but the jury declined to impose the death penalty. He was acquitted of the charge of attempting to spy for Libya. He was sentenced to life imprisonment without parole in March of that year. Regan's wife Anette avoided prosecution for attempting to cover up his actions.

Five months after the conclusion of the trial, FBI agents began searching for the classified documents. Highly sensitive documents would be discovered in the states of Maryland and Virginia, with over 10,000 assorted papers, videos, and CD-ROMs found; two anonymous sources believed all the hidden material had been found. He is currently incarcerated at Federal Correctional Institution, Hazelton in Preston County, West Virginia. In 2016, journalist Yudhijit Bhattacharjee released a book about Regan and his capture titled The Spy Who Couldn't Spell: A Dyslexic Traitor, an Unbreakable Code, and the FBI's Hunt for America's Stolen Secrets.

See also

Aldrich Ames
Robert Hanssen
Chelsea Manning
Edward Snowden

References

External links
The Guardian Long Read Audio. The spy who couldn't spell: how the biggest heist in the history of US espionage was foiled.
Portrait of spy case, related to CNN broadcast
Biography, on site of espionage cases, on FBI website
"FBI Unearths Convicted Spy's Buried Booty". FBI. July 30, 2003.

American people convicted of attempted spying against the United States
American prisoners sentenced to life imprisonment
Prisoners sentenced to life imprisonment by the United States federal government
United States Air Force airmen
National Reconnaissance Office personnel
1962 births
Living people